Alfred Charles Bossom, Baron Bossom GCStJ FRIBA (6 October 1881 – 4 September 1965) was an  architect in the United States who returned to his native England and became a Conservative Party politician. He also wrote books on architecture.

Architectural career 
Bossom was born in Islington, London, to Alfred Henry Bossom, a stationer, and his wife Amelia Jane, née Hammond. He was educated at St. Thomas's Charterhouse School, in the City, and studied architecture at the Regent Street Polytechnic and the Royal Academy of Arts. In 1904 he left for the United States to work for Carnegie Steel in Pittsburgh, Pennsylvania. He worked on the restoration of Fort Ticonderoga from 1908.

In 1910, he married Emily, daughter of New York City banker, Samuel Bayne, and they had three sons. As an architect with offices at 680 Fifth Avenue, Manhattan, Bossom specialized in the efficient construction of skyscrapers. While based in New York City he designed a number of major works in Texas, including the American Exchange National Bank (1918). Bossom's Dallas work on the Maple Terrace Apartments (1924–1925), and the expansion and renovation of the Adolphus Hotel, were done with local architects Thomson and Swaine. After traveling into Mexico, Bossom became a proponent of Mayan Revival architecture, clearly reflected in the stepped-back tower and ornament of his 1927 Petroleum Building in Houston.

Bossom also designed a number of large houses. Examples include the Henry Devereux Whiton house in Hewlett, New York, additions to the Joseph Wright Harriman house in Brookville, New York, and the remarkable Edward Howland Robinson Green estate in Round Hill, Massachusetts.

He also invented a device for protecting people from suffocating if they accidentally got locked in a bank vault.

A number of architects began their careers in his offices. Samuel Juster and Anthony DePace met in these offices, later founding the firm of DePace and Juster; DePace went from Bossom's skyscraper work to become project manager at Cass Gilbert's offices, project managing the New York Life Building.

Return to England 

At the height of his career in 1926, Bossom returned to England with his family, determined that his children should be educated there. Entirely detached from his architectural career, he began a new life of public service and was elected as member of Parliament (MP) for Maidstone at the 1931 general election. He held the seat until he retired from the House of Commons at the 1959 general election, having taken time out during World War II to serve in the British Home Guard. In 1931, Bossom and Mansfield Forbes bought Bourn Windmill, Cambridgeshire. They had the mill repaired, and presented it to the Cambridge Preservation Society in 1932. Later that year, Bossom's wife had died in an aircrash, and he was remarried to another American, Elinor Dittenhofer in 1934, but they were divorced in 1947.

In 1953 he held the reception of Margaret Roberts after her marriage to Denis Thatcher at his Chelsea home; later she became Britain's first female prime minister (1979–1990).

In 1952, he was made an honorary Doctor of Law by the University of Pittsburgh. On 4 July 1953, he was created a baronet, of Maidstone in the County of Kent. On 30 January 1960, he was created a life peer as Baron Bossom, of Maidstone in the County of Kent. In 1965, Bossom died in London, and as his title was a life peerage, it became extinct upon his death, although his hereditary baronetcy passed to his only surviving child, Clive (his eldest and youngest sons had died in 1932 and 1959 respectively).

Bossom was also president of the Anglo-Baltic Society. Winston Churchill joked of him, "Bossom, Bossom, that's an odd name! Neither one thing nor the other", in reference to the words "buxom" and "bottom".

Architectural designs 

Fort Ticonderoga, architect of the first stages of the reconstruction of the French fortress for Col. Robert M Thompson and Mr & Mrs Stephen HP Pell, 1908-
Covington Saving Bank Building, 1910
First National Bank Building, as designer for Clinton and Russell, Richmond, Virginia, 1912-1913
American Exchange National Bank (1918)
Virginia Mutual Building, with local architects Carneal and Johnston, Richmond, Virginia, 1919
Virginia Trust Company Building in Richmond
Lynchburg National Bank and Trust at Ninth and Main in Lynchburg
Edward Howland Robinson Green Mansion, Round Hill, Massachusetts, 1921
Magnolia Hotel, with local architects Lang & Witchell, Dallas, Texas, 1922
Maple Terrace Apartments (Dallas, Texas) (1924–25), 
United States National Bank, Galveston, Texas, 1924
Liberty Building, Buffalo, New York, 1925
Petroleum Building, Houston, Texas, 1925–26
Federal-American National Bank, Washington, D.C., 1925–1926
First National Bank Building, Jersey City, New Jersey, 1920
 Prestwould Apartments, Richmond, Virginia 1929

Selected works 
He authored books on architecture including:
 An Architectural Pilgrimage in Old Mexico, Charles Scribner's, 1924.
 Building to the Skies: The Romance of the Skyscraper, 1934.

Notes

References 
 Dennis Sharp, ed., Alfred C. Bossom's American Architecture, 1903-1926, London: Book Art, 1984.
 Robert B. MacKay, Long Island Country Houses and Their Architects, 1860-1940, W. W. Norton & Company, 1997. .
 The Handbook of Texas Online

External links 
 

1881 births
1965 deaths
People from Islington (district)
Alumni of the Regent Street Polytechnic
Architects from London
Conservative Party (UK) MPs for English constituencies
Bailiffs Grand Cross of the Order of St John
Officiers of the Légion d'honneur
Life peers
20th-century English architects
Fellows of the Royal Institute of British Architects
UK MPs 1931–1935
UK MPs 1935–1945
UK MPs 1945–1950
UK MPs 1950–1951
UK MPs 1951–1955
UK MPs 1955–1959
UK MPs who were granted peerages
20th-century American architects
British emigrants to the United States
Members of London County Council
Baronets in the Baronetage of the United Kingdom
Life peers created by Elizabeth II